James Joseph Florio (August 29, 1937 – September 25, 2022) was an American politician who served as the 49th governor of New Jersey from 1990 to 1994. He was previously the U.S. Representative for New Jersey's 1st congressional district from 1975 to 1990 and served in the New Jersey General Assembly from 1970 to 1975. He was a member of the Democratic Party.

Early life 
Florio was one of three children, all sons, born to Lillian Ellen (née Hazell) Florio (June 18, 1917 – May 2, 2000) and Vincenzo [later Vincent Joseph] Florio (May 12, 1914 – April 7, 1994), who wed in 1936. James and his brothers were raised in the Kensington subsection of Flatbush in Brooklyn, New York. His father was of Italian descent and his mother was of Scottish, Irish, and German descent. He attended Erasmus Hall High School in Flatbush.

Florio received a Bachelor of Arts in social studies from Trenton State College in 1962 and started graduate studies in public law and government at Columbia University on a Woodrow Wilson Fellowship before earning a Juris Doctor from Rutgers School of Law–Camden in 1967. After graduating from law school, he volunteered to work for the Democratic Party and was mentored by past Camden Mayor Angelo Errichetti. Florio was an amateur boxer. He served as an enlisted member of the United States Navy from 1955 to 1958 and continued to serve in the United States Naval Reserve as a commissioned officer until 1975, ultimately achieving the rank of lieutenant commander. After being admitted to the bar, he became the assistant city attorney for the City of Camden, a position he would hold until 1971. He was the borough solicitor for the New Jersey towns of Runnemede, Woodlynne, and Somerdale from 1969 to 1974.

Early political career 
In both 1969 and 1971, Florio was elected to represent the 3rd Legislative District in the New Jersey General Assembly, covering portions of Camden County, each time with Democratic running mate John J. Horn, whom Florio had served as a legislative aide while he was still in law school. He was elected in 1973, together with Ernest F. Schuck, to represent the 5th Legislative District in the General Assembly, which covered portions of Camden County and Gloucester County; Florio resigned in 1975 to take a seat in the U.S House of Representatives.

In November 1974, Florio was elected to the United States House of Representatives from New Jersey's 1st congressional district, defeating incumbent John E. Hunt. He served from January 3, 1975, until January 16, 1990, when he resigned to take the oath of office to serve as governor.

In Congress, Florio authored the Superfund legislation to clean up the most polluted sites in the country in 1980. He was the author of the Railroad Deregulation Law which saved the nation's freight railroads, including Conrail. He was also cosponsor of the Exon-Florio Amendment, which created the Treasury Department's Committee on Foreign Investment in the United States and effectively removed Congress from the approval process on foreign takeovers of U.S. industrial concerns. This legislation was a factor in the Dubai Ports World controversy in 2006.

Governorship 
While in Congress, Florio made three attempts to be elected Governor of New Jersey, in 1977, 1981, and 1989.  While Florio's first attempt was unsuccessful (partly due to the fact that he was running against an incumbent in Brendan Byrne), he did manage to win the Democratic nomination in 1981. He lost in a controversial election to Tom Kean, Sr.; the election involvement of the Republican National Committee received significant subsequent attention; the RNC allegedly appointed a Ballot Security Task Force, made up of off-duty police officers.

Florio's loss in the 1981 general election was the closest in New Jersey history, and was not decided with certainty until several weeks after Election Day. He declined to run against Kean in 1985, and in the 1989 New Jersey gubernatorial election he finally won both the nomination and the election. During his campaign, Florio said "You can write this statement down: 'Florio feels there is no need for new taxes.'" Florio won the election over Republican Jim Courter with 61% of the vote, becoming the first American of Italian descent to hold the position as Governor of New Jersey.

The Florio administration started during the late 1980s recession and thus faced a budget deficit, and Florio had his own desires to increase education aid to New Jersey's low-wealth school districts. Faced with a projected 1991 deficit of $3 billion, Florio asked for a $2.8 billion tax increase, most in the way of a sales tax increase and an increase in the state excise taxes on various goods. It was the largest increase of any state in U.S. history. The money generated balanced the budget, increased property tax relief programs, and increased education spending in the Abbott districts. Governor Florio also eliminated 1,500 government jobs and cut perks for state officials.

Florio also redistributed hundreds of millions of dollars of school aid to urban (see the Abbott case) and rural districts away from suburban districts. Under Florio's plan, known as the Quality Education Act, 151 suburban districts would lose almost all of their education funding and have to assume pension costs, Social Security payments, and retiree health costs; another 71 districts would have large reductions in aid and have to assume smaller portions of retiree benefits; and about 350 districts would see increases in aid. The aid cuts fell the most heavily in North Jersey, especially Bergen County, West Essex, East Morris, Union counties, and on the Jersey Shore.

A grassroots taxpayer revolt sprouted in 1990, spearheaded by a citizens' group named "Hands Across New Jersey" founded by John Budzash, a postal worker from Howell Township. Budzash was a frequent guest on radio and television shows throughout New Jersey, New York, and Pennsylvania speaking out against the new taxes. Florio was a regular topic on active anti-tax broadcasting from talk radio stations New Jersey 101.5 to Curtis Sliwa's AM radio talk show and Bob Grant's AM radio talk show, both based in New York City. Sliwa, Grant, and John and Ken from New Jersey 101.5, along with Alan Keyes (who in later years was a presidential candidate in the Republican primary), were guest speakers at two rallies held by Hands Across New Jersey protesting both George H. W. Bush and Florio's tax increases. Bumper stickers with "Impeach Florio" were seen around the state.

Prior to the 1991 New Jersey elections, Democrats held majorities in both the New Jersey General Assembly and the New Jersey State Senate.  But voter anger was so great that after the 1991 election, Republicans were to win veto-proof majorities in both houses.  An example of Republican strength at this time was their promise to roll back the sales tax, which was raised by one percentage point during the first two years of the Florio administration. The rollback was passed in both houses, only to be vetoed by Florio. Republicans then overrode Florio's veto and the rollback was passed.

In order to pay for the increased aid in rural and urban districts and maintain suburban school aid, Florio and the legislature passed the "Pension Reevaluation Act".  The Pension Reevaluation Act changed the actuarial calculations used to calculate the State's pension contributions, from using the book value of pension assets, a more conservative approach, to a market-related value, and increased the assumed rate of return for investments from 7 percent to 8.75 percent. The Pension Reevaluation Act reduced New Jersey's pension contributions by $1.5 billion in 1992.

Florio also signed a 20% reduction of auto insurance premiums. In May 1990, he enacted the stiffest laws in the U.S. on owning or selling semi-automatic firearms, and in 1993, Florio vetoed a bill the Republican-led legislature passed to repeal most of the law. The National Rifle Association lobbied hard to override the governor's veto, but the Republicans backed down.

1993 election 
In 1991, the Democrats lost their majority in both chambers of the state legislature, for the first time in 20 years (Republicans controlled the state assembly after the 1985 and 1987 elections). The governor's approval ratings were as low as 18% but stabilized to roughly 50% by 1993. He made an effort for conservative support by putting in place tighter restrictions on welfare payments to mothers and enjoyed the strong support of President Bill Clinton. Clinton advisers James Carville and Paul Begala worked on his campaign. Due in large part to the tax hikes, Florio lost his bid for re-election to Republican Somerset County freeholder Christine Todd Whitman and became the first Democratic Governor since the adoption of the state's current constitution in 1947 to lose a re-election vote. Republican William T. Cahill, elected in 1969, became the first Governor to lose reelection when he was defeated in the Republican primary in 1973. Whitman won by a narrow margin of 26,093 votes out of 2,505,964 votes cast. Florio is the last politician from South Jersey to win statewide office.

Cabinet and administration

Post governorship 
In 2000, Florio ran for the Democratic nomination for the United States Senate seat that was being vacated by Frank Lautenberg. His opponent was businessman Jon Corzine, former chairman and CEO of Goldman Sachs. In the most expensive Senate primary in history, Corzine won with 246,472 votes, or 58%, while Florio had 179,059 votes, or 42%.

Florio served as the Chairman of the New Jersey Pinelands Commission from November 2002 to June 2005. As a congressman in the late 1970s, he was instrumental in shaping the legislation that established the New Jersey Pinelands National Reserve. He was a critic of the George W. Bush administration and the Iraq War. In a letter to the editor of The New York Times, he made a connection between the war and Bush's energy policy saying, "the nation's right to know has never been more important".
 
Florio supported Hillary Clinton in the 2008 Democratic primaries for President.

Florio served on the board of directors of Trump Entertainment Resorts until he and other board members were forced to resign following the company's entry into its third bankruptcy. He also served on the board of Plymouth Financial Company, Inc. He was a founding partner and of counsel to the law firm of Florio, Perrucci, Steinhardt, Cappelli, Tipton & Taylor.

Florio taught at the Edward J. Bloustein School of Planning and Public Policy at Rutgers University.

Personal life and death
Florio was married twice: first to Maryanne Spaeth until their divorce, and then to Lucinda Coleman from 1988 until his death. He had three children.

On September 25, 2022, Florio died from heart failure at a hospital in Voorhees, at age 85.

Honors 
In 1993, Florio was awarded the John F. Kennedy Profile in Courage Award, for his support for gun control. In 2014, he was inducted into the New Jersey Hall of Fame. The Camden County Board of Chosen Freeholders named the Governor James J. Florio Center for Public Service, a primary county administrative building, in Florio's honor in 2017.

References

External links 
 
 New Jersey Governor Jim Florio,
 

|-

|-

|-

|-

|-

1937 births
2022 deaths
20th-century American lawyers
20th-century American politicians
American people of Italian descent
American people of German descent
American people of Irish descent
American people of Scottish descent
Candidates in the 1981 United States elections
Candidates in the 2000 United States elections
Deaths from congestive heart failure
Democratic Party governors of New Jersey
Democratic Party members of the United States House of Representatives from New Jersey
Erasmus Hall High School alumni
Democratic Party members of the New Jersey General Assembly
Military personnel from New Jersey
New Jersey lawyers
People from Metuchen, New Jersey
Politicians from Brooklyn
Politicians from Camden, New Jersey
Rutgers School of Law–Camden alumni
The College of New Jersey alumni
United States Navy officers
Members of Congress who became lobbyists